Garrigues may refer to:

 Garrigues, Hérault, a commune in the Hérault department of France
 Garrigues-Sainte-Eulalie, a commune in the Gard department of France
 Garrigues, Tarn, a commune in the Tarn department of France
 Garrigues (comarca), a county in Catalonia, Spain
 Garrigues (law firm), a law firm headquartered in Madrid, Spain

People
 Anabel Medina Garrigues, Spanish professional tennis player
 Chantal Garrigues (1944-2018), French actress
 Charles Harris Garrigues (1903–1974), California journalist
 Charlotte Garrigue (1850–1923), wife of Tomáš Garrigue Masaryk, the first president of Czechoslovakia
 Daniel Garrigue (born 1948), member of the National Assembly of France
 Henry Jacques Garrigues (1831–1912), American doctor
 Jean Garrigue (1912–1972), American poet
 Malvina Garrigues (Schnorr von Carolsfeld) (1825–1904), Danish-German operatic soprano
 Richard Garrigues, naturalist, writer and videographer, author of The Birds of Costa Rica
 Tomáš Garrigue Masaryk (1850-1937), first president of Czechoslovakia

See also
 Garrigue, a type of vegetation found on limestone soils around the Mediterranean Basin